Subclass may refer to:

 Subclass (taxonomy), a taxonomic rank below "class"
 Subclass (computer science)
 Subclass (set theory)

See also 
 Superclass